Elk thistle is a common name for several plants and may refer to:

Cirsium foliosum
Cirsium scariosum, native to western North America